Driving Blind is a 1997 short story collection by American writer Ray Bradbury.  All but four of the stories are original to this collection.

Contents
 "Night Train to Babylon"
 "If MGM Is Killed, Who Gets the Lion?"
 "Hello, I Must Be Going"
 "House Divided"
 "Grand Theft"
 "Remember Me?"
 "Fee Fie Foe Fum"
 "Driving Blind"
 "I Wonder What’s Become of Sally"
 "Nothing Changes"
 "That Old Dog Lying in the Dust"
 "Someone in the Rain"
 "Madame Et Monsieur Shill"
 "The Mirror"
 "End of Summer"
 "Thunder in the Morning"
 "The Highest Branch on the Tree"
 "A Woman Is a Fast-Moving Picnic"
 "Virgin Resusitas"
 "Mr. Pale"
 "That Bird That Comes Out of the Clock"
 A Brief Afterword

References

External links
 
 

1997 short story collections
Short story collections by Ray Bradbury
Avon (publisher) books